The 2015–16 Coupe de la Ligue was the 22nd French league cup competition. The competition was organized by the Ligue de Football Professionnel and was open to the 44 professional clubs in France that are managed by the organization.

Paris Saint-Germain were the two-time reigning champions, having defeated Bastia 4–0 in the previous season's final and their win in this competition 2–1 against Lille put the club at six wins, extending their record.

First round
First round matches were held over 1 day; 11 August 2015. The 12 winners secured places in the second round. All times in Central European Time.

Second round
The round featured the 12 winners of the first-round matches. The matches were held over 1 day; 25 August 2015. The 6 winners secured places in the third round. All games in Central European Time.

Third round
The Third Round, also known as the Round of 32, featured the 6 winners of the second round matches in addition to 14 Ligue 1 clubs who were not participating in the European competitions. The matches were played 27 and 28 October 2015, and 25 November 2015. All games in Central European Time.

Round of 16
The Fourth Round, also known as the Round of 16, featured the 10 winners of the third round matches in addition to 6 Ligue 1 clubs who were participating in the European competitions. The matches were played on 15 and 16 December 2015.

Quarter-finals
The Fifth Round, also known as the quarter-finals, featured the 8 winners of the Round of 16 matches. The four matches were played on 12 and 13 January 2016.

Semi-finals
The semi-finals were drawn after the quarter-finals and were played on 26 and 27 January 2016.

Final

See also
 2015–16 Ligue 1
 2015–16 Ligue 2

References

External links

 Official site  

Coupe de la Ligue seasons
France
League Cup